Paul Georges Alexandre Rodde (17 May 1894 – 29 October 1917) was a French World War I flying ace credited with five confirmed aerial victories.

Biography
Georges Alexandre Rodde was born on 17 May 1894 in Fontainebleau, France.

His military service began on 4 September 1914 as an infantryman. On 6 December 1914, he was transferred to aviation duty. In May 1915, he reported for pilot training. His Military Pilot's Brevet was awarded to him on 23 September 1915. On 3 October, he was posted to a bombing squadron, Escadrille MF.55. He was promoted to Sergent on 21 January 1916. He scored his first victory with this unit on 28 May 1916 before transferring to another bombing squadron, Escadrille MF.23, on 3 March 1917. He shot down a second German airplane on 21 May 1917. Transferred on 30 July 1917 to a fighter unit, Escadrille Spa.69, he scored three more victories during September and October 1917, including an observation balloon. As his fifth victory, the destruction of the balloon made him an ace.

Paul Rodde perished in a flying accident in the line of duty on 29 October 1917.

See also
 Aerial victory standards of World War I

Endnotes

References
 Franks, Norman; Bailey, Frank (1993). Over the Front: The Complete Record of the Fighter Aces and Units of the United States and French Air Services, 1914–1918. London, UK: Grub Street Publishing. .

1894 births
1917 deaths
French World War I flying aces
Military personnel from Paris
French military personnel killed in World War I